Hi-Five is an American R&B quintet from Waco, Texas. Hi-Five had a No. 1 hit on [[Billboard Hot 100|Billboard'''s Hot 100]] in 1991 with "I Like the Way (The Kissing Game)". 

The band was formed in 1989 and consisted of founding and original members: Tony Thompson, Roderick "Pooh" Clark, Marcus Sanders, Russell Neal, and Oklahoma City, Oklahoma, native, Toriano Easley.

 Early career 
Hi-Five was originally signed to Jive Records in late 1989 and released their eponymous debut album in 1990. The album was produced by Teddy Riley and went platinum. It included singles "I Just Can't Handle It" (R&B No. 10), "I Can't Wait Another Minute" (Pop No. 8, R&B No.1) and "I Like the Way (The Kissing Game)", which went to number one on the U.S. Billboard Hot 100 and the U.S. Hot R&B/Hip-Hop Songs chart (making it their biggest hit to date). 

The group's second LP, Keep It Goin' On, was released in 1992. Though not as successful as their debut effort, several tracks from this album, including "She's Playing Hard to Get" (Pop No. 5, R&B No. 2) and the R. Kelly-penned "Quality Time" (Pop No. 38, R&B No. 3) got major airplay in East Coast (US) urban markets. Shortly after this album was released, the group was involved in a vehicular accident, which left Roderick "Pooh" Clark paralyzed from the chest down.

In 1993, Hi-Five emerged with a third album, Faithful, which featured the songs "Unconditional Love" (Pop No. 92, R&B No. 21) and "Never Should've Let You Go" (Pop No. 30, R&B No. 10). "Unconditional Love" was also featured in the multi-platinum Menace II Society soundtrack, and received extensive airplay on urban contemporary stations throughout the summer of 1993 as the movie increased in popularity. "Never Should've Let You Go" was featured in the Sister Act 2 soundtrack.

 Later career 
On June 1, 2007, Tony Thompson's body was discovered by security officers at around 10 p.m. near an air-conditioning unit outside of an apartment complex in his native Waco, Texas. An autopsy later determined that he had died from "toxic effects of chlorodifluoromethane," or inhaling a toxic amount of freon. He is buried at Doris Miller Memorial Park in Waco.

In 2011, Treston Irby released his debut solo single "Everything" under the mantle Tru$ on his independent label, Bronx Most Wanted Ent. 

In 2012, Irby, Shannon Gill and Marcus Sanders reformed Hi-Five with two new members, Andre Ramseur (aka Dre Wonda) and Faruq Evans. They released a single called "Favorite Girl" also on the BMW label. Ramseur later left the group and was replaced by Billy Covington. 

On July 2, 2014, former Hi-Five member Russell Neal was charged with murder, over the fatal stabbing of his wife in Houston.

Hi-Five was featured on the TVOne music documentary series Unsung'' on August 6, 2014, chronicling the quintet's upbringing in Waco, their rise to superstardom, tragedies among group members, and their comeback.

Former member Roderick “Pooh” Clark died on April 17, 2022, at the age of 49.

Discography

Studio albums

EP

Compilation albums

Singles

Music videos

References

External links
 
 
 
 

African-American musical groups
American pop music groups
American soul musical groups
American contemporary R&B musical groups
American boy bands
New jack swing music groups
Musical groups from Waco, Texas
Musical groups established in 1989
Musical groups disestablished in 1994
Musical groups reestablished in 2012
Jive Records artists
Vocal quintets
Waco High School alumni